Abdulla Maxsumovich Xolmuhamedov is a retired Uzbek general who has served as the 5th Commander of the Uzbekistan Air and Air Defence Forces from 2003 to 2008.

Biography

Soviet military service
In 1975, he graduated from Syzran Higher Military Aviation School and began serving in Transcaucasian Military District as a pilot.
In the early 80s, he participated in hostilities in the Democratic Republic of Afghanistan. He graduated from Gagarin Air Force Academy in 1987. That same year, he was deployed to the Mongolian People's Republic as part of a contingent from the Transbaikal Military District. In 1990, he became the Deputy Commander of a regiment of the Far Eastern Military District.

Uzbek military service
He became commander of the military transport aviation regiment (Tuzel) shortly after the fall of the Soviet Union. In 1997, he was appointed a commander of a military transport aviation base. Upon the turn of the 21st century in the year 2000, he was appointed the air force's head of the flight training, becoming an inspector-adviser a year later. In 2002, he was promoted to the post of deputy commander and in 2003 became the commander of the air defense and air forces. In 2008, he became head of the flight safety department of the Ministry of Defense of Uzbekistan. In 2009, he retired from military service.

He is a recipient of the Shon-Sharaf Order.

References

1954 births
Living people
Uzbekistani military personnel
Syzran Higher Military Aviation School alumni
Soviet Air Force officers
Soviet military personnel of the Soviet–Afghan War